Shatian may refer to:

Shatian Township, subdivision of Ningxiang County, Hunan

Towns
Shatian, Dongguan, Guangdong
Shatian, Fengshun County, Guangdong
Shatian, Gaozhou, subdivision of Gaozhou, Guangdong
Shatian, Huizhou, subdivision of Huiyang District, Huizhou, Guangdong
Shatian, Xinfeng County, subdivision of Xinfeng County, Guangdong
Shatian, Hepu County, subdivision of Hepu County, Guangxi
Shatian, Hezhou, subdivision of Pinggui District, Hezhou, Guangxi
Shatian, Yulin, Guangxi, subdivision of Yuzhou District, Yulin, Guangxi
Shatian, Guidong County, subdivision of Guidong County, Hunan
Shatian, Jiangxi, subdivision of Guangfeng District, Shangrao, Jiangxi

See also 
 Sha Tin, an area in Hong Kong
 Sha Tin District, in Hong Kong
 Sha Tin New Town, in Hong Kong